The Senior Women's Cricket Inter Zonal Three Day Game is an Indian women's cricket first-class domestic competition organised by the Board of Control for Cricket in India. The competition began in 2014–15, as a two-day competition, with the three subsequent competitions in 2015–16, 2016–17 and 2017–18 operating with a three-day format. 

The competition features five teams each representing a region (or "zone") of India: Central Zone, East Zone, North Zone, South Zone and West Zone. Central Zone are the most successful team in the history of the competition, winning the first three editions. The holders are North Zone, who won the most recent competition in 2017–18.

History
The competition began in February 2015, as the Senior Women's Cricket Inter Zonal Two Day Game, with the five zonal teams playing each other once in two-day matches, all held in Kolkata. No matches were won outright, but points were awarded for leading on the first innings of the match. Central Zone were the inaugural winners of the competition, winning three of their four matches on first innings.

The following season, 2015–16, the format was changed to three-day matches, and the tournament was held in Guntur District in Andhra Pradesh. Central Zone were again the champions, winning one match outright and another two on first innings. Central Zone won their third title in 2016–17, when the tournament was held in Chhattisgarh, winning two of their four matches.

In 2017–18 the competition was held in Kerala and was won for the first time by North Zone.

Teams

Competition format
Matches in the tournament are played using a three-day format (apart from the first season, in which matches were two-days). The five teams each play each other once in a round-robin format, therefore playing four matches in a season. All five teams compete in one league, with the team that finishes top at the end of the season being crowned the champions.

Teams are awarded 6 points for a win, 3 points for a tie and 0 points for a loss. If a match is drawn, the team that has the highest score at the end of the first innings receives 3 points, whilst the team that has the lower score receives one point. Both teams receive 1 point if both first innings are not completed, the two scores are tied, or if the match is abandoned. If two teams are joint on points in the table, the tiebreakers are most wins and then net run rate.

Tournament results

References

Senior Women's Cricket Inter Zonal Three Day Game
Recurring sporting events established in 2015
First-class cricket competitions
Indian domestic cricket competitions